Pasiphila melochlora is a moth in the family Geometridae. It is endemic to New Zealand.

The larvae feed on the foliage of Clianthus maximus.

References

External links

Moths described in 1911
melochlora
Moths of New Zealand
Endemic fauna of New Zealand
Taxa named by Edward Meyrick
Endemic moths of New Zealand